Martinak State Park is a public recreation area located on the Choptank River and Watts Creek, immediately south of Denton in Caroline County, Maryland. The park bears the name of George Martinak, who deeded his land to the state in 1961. The park opened in 1964. Site improvements including the addition of campsites, roads, and park office took place from 1964 to 1974. The park features boating access, fishing, campsites and cabins, hiking trails, a nature center, and painted rocks.

References

External links

Martinak State Park Maryland Department of Natural Resources
Martinak State Park Map Maryland Department of Natural Resources

State parks of Maryland
Parks in Caroline County, Maryland
Protected areas established in 1961